Jonkheer Alexander "Dr Xand" van Tulleken (born 18 August 1978) is a British doctor and TV presenter. He is best known for presenting the CBBC children's series Operation Ouch! with his slightly younger identical twin brother Chris , and the Channel 4 show How to Lose Weight Well. 

Van Tulleken has presented many documentaries, including an episode of Horizon discussing male suicide and a BBC programme on the European migrant crisis. He can often be seen offering up his own body for science experimentation in diet show How to Lose Weight Well, as well as in BBC Horizon episodes "Sugar vs Fat" and "Is Binge Drinking Really That Bad?" He is currently appearing regularly on the BBC1 weekday programme Morning Live, providing a variety of medical advice. Van Tulleken is also a member of the "Made of stronger stuff" podcast on BBC sounds

References

External links 

1978 births
Living people
Alumni of Somerville College, Oxford
Horizon (British TV series)
People educated at King's College School, London
British television presenters